Bednja is a village and municipality in Croatia in Varaždin County (west of Lepoglava), and also a river in northern Croatia.

According to the 2011 census, there are a total of 3,992 inhabitants, in the following settlements:
 Bednja, population 677
 Benkovec, population 234
 Brezova Gora, population 69
 Cvetlin, population 283
 Jamno, population 86
 Jazbina Cvetlinska, population 337
 Ježovec, population 305
 Mali Gorenec, population 109
 Meljan, population 148
 Osonjak, population 47
 Pašnik, population 65
 Pleš, population 261
 Podgorje Bednjansko, population 20
 Prebukovje, population 97
 Purga Bednjanska, population 119
 Rinkovec, population 284
 Sveti Josip, population 3
 Šaša, population 111
 Šinkovica Bednjanska, population 121
 Šinkovica Šaška, population 111
 Trakošćan, population 18
 Veliki Gorenec, population 50
 Vranojelje, population 131
 Vrbno, population 267
 Vrhovec Bednjanski, population 39

The majority of the population is of Croat descent.

References

Municipalities of Croatia
Populated places in Varaždin County

sr:Бедња